Ty-Shon Leron Alexander (born July 16, 1998) is an American professional basketball player for the Delaware Blue Coats of the NBA G League. He played college basketball for the Creighton Bluejays.

Alexander signed with the Phoenix Suns in November 2020 after going undrafted in the 2020 NBA draft. During his rookie season with the Suns, he reached the NBA Finals.

High school career
Alexander attended Concord High School his freshman year and was named to the All-South Piedmont 3A Conference team and earned honorable mention on MaxPreps.com's Freshman All-American Team. He transferred to Northside Christian Academy in Charlotte, North Carolina as a sophomore. As a junior, he moved on to Oak Hill Academy. Alexander scored 50 points in a game as a senior. He averaged 14.1 points per game as a senior, shooting 46.3 percent from behind the arc. He was considered a four-star recruit and was ranked No. 85 in his class by Rivals. Alexander committed to Creighton on October 31, 2015, turning down offers from Clemson, Charlotte and Virginia Tech.

College career
On November 20, 2017, Alexander was named Big East freshman of the week after registering 14 points, three rebounds and two assists in a 92–88 victory over Northwestern. He posted 5.5 points, 2.1 rebounds and 1.8 assists per game as a freshman playing backup to Marcus Foster. In the offseason after his freshman year, Alexander made a point to take 100 shots before bed and work on his shooting technique in order to become Creighton's next great scorer. Alexander scored a career-high 36 points on November 22, 2018, in a 87–82 win against Clemson. He was named Big East player of the week on January 28, 2019, after contributing 26 points, seven rebounds, and four assists in a 91–87 win against Georgetown. As a sophomore, Alexander averaged 15.7 points, 4.0 rebounds and 2.7 assists per game. Alexander was an All-Big East Honorable Mention selection alongside teammate Martin Krampelj. Alexander surpassed the 1,000 point mark in a loss to Georgetown on January 16, 2020, finishing with 14 points. At the conclusion of the regular season, Alexander was named to the First Team All-Big East. As a junior, Alexander averaged 16.9 points, 5.0 rebounds, 2.3 assists, and 1.3 steals per game, finishing second in the Big East in free throw percentage at 86 percent and sixth in the conference at three-point shooting at 39.9 percent. Following the season, he declared for the 2020 NBA draft.

Professional career

Phoenix Suns (2020–2021)
After going undrafted in the 2020 NBA draft, Alexander signed a two-way contract with the Phoenix Suns. Alexander made his NBA debut on December 27, 2020 in a 116–100 win over the Sacramento Kings. He got a rebound and an assist two days later in a blowout 111–86 win over the New Orleans Pelicans. Since the Phoenix Suns did not assign their Northern Arizona Suns franchise to the 2021 NBA G League Bubble at the ESPN Wide World of Sports Complex in Orlando, his G League rights were transferred to the Canton Charge for his rookie season. Alexander made it to the 2021 NBA Finals, but the Suns lost in 6 games to the Milwaukee Bucks. On August 26, 2021, he was waived by the Suns.

Virtus Bologna (2021–2022)
In September 2021, Alexander signed a two-year deal with Virtus Bologna of the Italian Lega Basket Serie A (LBA). On 21 September, the team won its second Supercup, defeating Olimpia Milano 90–84. However, on 15 February 2022, Alexander and the club agreed on ending the contract.

Pallacanestro Trieste (2022)
On 15 February 2022, Alexander was signed by Pallacanestro Trieste, another team of LBA.

Greensboro Swarm (2022–2023)
Alexander joined the Charlotte Hornets for the 2022 NBA Summer League. He later joined the Greensboro Swarm training camp roster. On November 4, 2022, he was named to the opening night roster.

Delaware Blue Coats (2023–present)
On February 24, 2023, Alexander was traded to the Delaware Blue Coats.

National team career
In the summer of 2019, Alexander was a part of the United States National team who competed at the Pan American Games in Peru. The team won bronze.

Career statistics

NBA

Regular season

|-
| style="text-align:left;"| 
| style="text-align:left;"| Phoenix
| 15 || 0 || 3.2 || .250 || .222 || .500 || .7 || .4 || .0 || .1 || .6
|- class="sortbottom"
| style="text-align:center;" colspan="2"| Career
| 15 || 0 || 3.2 || .250 || .222 || .500 || .7 || .4 || .0 || .1 || .6

Playoffs

|-
| style="text-align:left;"| 2021
| style="text-align:left;"| Phoenix
| 1 || 0 || 1.3 || 1.000 || — || — || .0 || .0 || .0 || .0 || 2.0
|- class="sortbottom"
| style="text-align:center;" colspan="2"| Career
| 1 || 0 || 1.3 || 1.000 || — || — || .0 || .0 || .0 || .0 || 2.0

College

|-
| style="text-align:left;"| 2017–18
| style="text-align:left;"| Creighton
| 33 || 1 || 17.7 || .418 || .333 || .707 || 2.1 || 1.8 || .3 || .1 || 5.5
|-
| style="text-align:left;"| 2018–19
| style="text-align:left;"| Creighton
| 34 || 34 || 32.6 || .406 || .365 || .794 || 4.0 || 2.7 || 1.2 || .3 || 15.7
|-
| style="text-align:left;"| 2019–20
| style="text-align:left;"| Creighton
| 31 || 31 || 34.7 || .431 || .399 || .860 || 5.0 || 2.3 || 1.3 || .3 || 16.9
|- class="sortbottom"
| style="text-align:center;" colspan="2"| Career
| 98 || 66 || 28.2 || .418 || .372 || .813 || 3.7 || 2.3 || .9 || .2 || 12.7

References

External links
Creighton Bluejays bio

1998 births
Living people
American expatriate basketball people in Italy
American men's basketball players
Basketball players at the 2019 Pan American Games
Basketball players from Charlotte, North Carolina
Canton Charge players
Creighton Bluejays men's basketball players
Delaware Blue Coats players
Greensboro Swarm players
Medalists at the 2019 Pan American Games
Pan American Games bronze medalists for the United States
Pan American Games medalists in basketball
Phoenix Suns players
Shooting guards
Undrafted National Basketball Association players
United States men's national basketball team players
Virtus Bologna players